I'm Going On, is a gospel music album by American contemporary gospel music group Commissioned, released in 1984 on Light Records.

Domestically, Commissioned's debut album reached at number 11, on the US Billboard Top Gospel albums chart.

Track listing 
 "I'm Going On"
 "'Tis So Sweet"
 "I Can See Jesus"
 "Unworthy"
 "You've Got a Friend"
 "The City"
 "Giving My Problems to You"
 "Surely We Need Him"

Personnel
Fred Hammond: vocals, bass
Keith Staten: vocals
Mitchell Jones: vocals
Karl Reid: vocals
Michael Brooks: keyboard
Michael Williams: drums
Scotti Jones: percussion

References

Commissioned (gospel group) albums
1984 albums